Carabus dietererberi is a species of beetle from family Carabidae that is endemic to Sichuan, China. They could sometimes be green as well.

References

dietererberi
Beetles described in 2001
Endemic fauna of Sichuan